John Charles "Johnny" Bedford (born January 6, 1983) is an American retired mixed martial artist and bare knuckle boxer. A professional since 2003, he has fought in the UFC, Bellator, the Legacy Fighting Alliance, and was a competitor on Spike TV's The Ultimate Fighter: Team Bisping vs. Team Miller

Background
Bedford was born and raised in Woodville, Ohio. At the age of five, Bedford began wrestling year round. He and his family would travel all over the Midwest so Bedford could compete in various wrestling tournaments. He went on to wrestle for Woodmore High School, where his father was the head wrestling coach. Bedford was a three-time state qualifier, placed in the state tournament twice, and during his senior year finished third in the state tournament with a record of 51-1. After graduating from Woodmore he enrolled at Cleveland State University. At Cleveland State, Bedford was on the wrestling team for a year and a half before he was removed from the school (as well as the wrestling squad) before later making the transition to a career in mixed martial arts.

Mixed martial arts career

Amateur career
Bedford began fighting in 2003 because he was a self-proclaimed "tough guy" that just wanted to prove how tough he was. Bedford proclaims his first six amateur fights took place in a barn where the promoter just asked the audience who wanted to fight and then would match them up by who was closest to one another's weight. With no commission in Ohio at the time, the fights were not sanctioned.

Early professional career
After a successful amateur career, Bedford took a year and half off from fighting before being offered his first professional fight in 2006 for $200. With no income, Bedford took the fight on short notice and lost via submission in the first round. Bedford began fighting more frequently and by the end of 2009 Bedford held a 13–8–1 record.

Bellator
Bedford was invited to fight for Bellator in 2010. The fight took place at Bellator 19 in Grand Prairie, Texas, on May 20, 2010. Bedford fought and defeated Jared Lopez via third-round TKO.

Post-Bellator
At King of Kombat 9: Resurrection, Bedford fought future UFC fighter, Edwin Figueroa. Bedford lost the fight via TKO in the opening of the second round, handing Bedford his only knockout loss in his career. Four months later he bounced back with a first round submission over WEC veteran Frank Gomez.

The Ultimate Fighter
In 2011, Bedford had signed with the UFC to compete on The Ultimate Fighter: Team Bisping vs. Team Miller in Las Vegas. In the first episode, Bedford fought Carson Beebe to gain entry into the Ultimate Fighter house. Bedford defeated Beebe in the first round via submission (neck crank). He was selected as a part of Team Mayhem.

Bedford then fought Josh Ferguson in the third episode and won by unanimous decision after using his superior size to take down and control Ferguson.

In the semi-finals Bedford pleaded for the fight against Team Mayhem teammate, John Dodson. The coaches and Dana White agreed with the fight, and matched the two up. After a closely contested first round, Bedford lost after being knocked unconscious one minute into round two. When asked if he knew where he was immediately after the fight, Bedford replied, "I'm in Ohio"; his home state.

Ultimate Fighting Championship
Though he did not win the show, Bedford signed an exclusive contract with the UFC. He officially made his UFC debut on December 3, 2011, at The Ultimate Fighter 14 Finale against Ultimate Fighter castmate Louis Gaudinot. Bedford dominated the entirety of the fight and won in the third round via TKO after hitting several knees to Gaudinot's body.

Bedford was expected to face Eddie Wineland on January 28, 2012, at UFC on Fox 2, replacing Demetrious Johnson who had been pulled from the bout to be a participant in the UFC's inaugural Flyweight tournament.  However, Wineland himself was forced out of the bout with an injury and replaced by promotional newcomer Mitch Gagnon.  On January 25, 2012, the UFC announced the bout was cancelled due to Gagnon's alleged visa issues. Bedford received his show-money of $8,000 dollars, despite the cancellation.

Bedford was expected to face Nick Denis at UFC on Fox 3 on May 5, 2012.  However, Bedford was forced out of the bout with an injury and replaced by Roland Delorme.

After nearly a year off due to various injuries, Bedford returned on December 15, 2012, to face Marcos Vinicius at The Ultimate Fighter: Team Carwin vs. Team Nelson Finale. He won the fight via KO in the second round.

Bedford was expected to face Erik Perez on April 27, 2013, at UFC 159.  However, Perez pulled out of the bout just days before the event citing an injury and was replaced by Bryan Caraway. He lost the back-and-forth fight via submission in the third round.

Bedford was expected to face Hugo Viana on September 4, 2013, at UFC Fight Night 28.  However, Bedford pulled out of the bout citing an injury and was replaced by Wilson Reis.

Bedford faced Rani Yahya on April 11, 2014, at UFC Fight Night 39.  The bout ended in a No Contest as an accidental clash of heads rendered Yahya unable to protect himself, forcing a referee stoppage at 0:39 of round 1. Bedford argued vociferously that the accidental clash of heads should have been ruled a TKO victory in his favor.

A rematch with Yahya was expected to take place on June 28, 2014, at UFC Fight Night 44.  However, Yahya was forced out of the bout and replaced by Cody Gibson. For the second time in a row, his fight ended under somewhat controversial circumstances as Bedford was dropped by punches from Gibson and the fight was stopped by the referee just as Bedford appeared to be regaining consciousness, resulting in a first-round TKO loss.

The rescheduled rematch with Rani Yahya eventually took place on September 13, 2014, at UFC Fight Night 51. Yahya won via submission in the second round, and Bedford was subsequently released from the promotion shortly after.

Grappling
On September 30, 2012, Johnny Bedford competed in a no gi super fight against Jimmy Flick (Flick Brother's MMA) at the American Grappling Federation's Dallas Fall Classic. Johnny won the match by points.

Bare knuckle boxing
Bedford faced Nick Mamalis at the inaugural Bare Knuckle FC event held on June 2, 2018. He won the fight via TKO in the second round.

He made his sophomore appearance in the sport against Matt Murphy at BKFC 3 on October 20, 2018. He won the fight via unanimous decision.

BKFC Lightweight Tournament and championship
Bedford entered the BKFC Lightweight tournament and faced Abdiel Velazquez at BKFC 5 on April 6, 2019. He won the fight via fourth-round knockout, advancing to the tournament finals.

In the tournament final on June 22, 2019, Bedford defeated Reggie Barnett, Jr. via unanimous decision to win BKFC and Police Gazette lightweight titles.

Bedford next faced Charles Bennett at BKFC 9 on November 16, 2019, in a non-title bout. He won the fight via second-round technical knockout.

Bedford was expected to make his first title defense against Dat Nguyen at BKFC 14 on November 14, 2020. The fight however was canceled due to a Bedford injury. Bedford eventually lost his title belt to undefeated Dat Nguyen on February 5, 2021, in Lakeland, Florida. 

Bedford faced Reggie Barnett, Jr. in a rematch for the vacant BKFC Bantamweight Championship at BKFC 20 on August 20, 2021. He won the fight via unanimous decision.

Championships and accomplishments
Warrior Xtreme Cagefighting
WXC Bantamweight Championship (One time)
Bare Knuckle Fighting Championship
BKFC Lightweight World Champion
Police Gazette Lightweight Bare Knuckle title

Mixed martial arts record

|-
|Loss
|align=center|23–14–1 (1)
|Jesse Arnett
|Decision (majority)
|Fight Night 5: Medicine Hat
|
|align=center| 5
|align=center| 5:00
|Dallas, Texas, United States
|
|-
|Loss
|align=center|23–13–1 (1)
|Jimmy Flick
|Submission (guillotine choke)
|Legacy Fighting Alliance 18
|
|align=center| 3
|align=center| 3:09
|Dallas, Texas, United States
|
|-
|Win
|align=center|23–12–1 (1)
|Eric Higaonna
|TKO (punches)
|WXC 68: Nemesis
|
|align=center| 1
|align=center| 1:28
|Ypsilanti, Michigan, United States
|
|-
|Win
|align=center|22–12–1 (1)
|Mike Hernandez
|Submission (rear-naked choke)
|WXC 64: Redemption
|
|align=center| 1
|align=center| 2:45
|Taylor, Michigan, United States
|
|-
|Win
|align=center|21–12–1 (1)
|Taylor Moore
|Submission (kimura)
|WXC 63: Implosion
|
|align=center| 4
|align=center| 2:15
|Southgate, Michigan, United States
|
|-
|Win
|align=center|20–12–1 (1)
|Josh Robinson
|TKO (punches)
|WXC 59: Homeland Pride
|
|align=center|5
|align=center|3:17
|Taylor, Michigan, United States
|
|-
|Loss
|align=center|19–12–1 (1)
|Rani Yahya
|Submission (kimura)
|UFC Fight Night: Bigfoot vs. Arlovski
|
|align=center| 2
|align=center| 2:04
|Brasília, Brazil
|
|-
|Loss
|align=center|19–11–1 (1)
|Cody Gibson
|TKO (punch) 
|UFC Fight Night: Swanson vs. Stephens
|
|align=center| 1
|align=center| 0:38
|San Antonio, Texas, United States
|
|-
|NC
|align=center| (1)
|Rani Yahya
| No Contest (accidental headbutt)
|UFC Fight Night: Nogueira vs. Nelson
|
|align=center|1
|align=center|0:39
|Abu Dhabi, United Arab Emirates
|
|-
|Loss
|align=center|19–10–1
|Bryan Caraway
| Submission (guillotine choke)
|UFC 159
|
|align=center|3
|align=center|4:44
|Newark, New Jersey, United States
|
|-
|Win
|align=center|19–9–1
|Marcos Vinicius
| KO (body kick and punches)
|The Ultimate Fighter 16 Finale
|
|align=center|2
|align=center|1:00
|Las Vegas, Nevada, United States
|
|-
|Win
|align=center|18–9–1
|Louis Gaudinot
|TKO (knees to the body)
|The Ultimate Fighter 14 Finale
|
|align=center|3
|align=center|1:58
|Las Vegas, Nevada, United States
|
|-
|Win
|align=center|17–9–1
|Frank Gomez
|Submission (rear-naked choke) 
|Jackson's MMA Series 3
|
|align=center|1
|align=center|1:34
|Albuquerque, New Mexico, United States
|
|- 
|Loss
|align=center|16–9–1
|Edwin Figueroa
|TKO (punches) 
|King of Kombat 9
|
|align=center|2
|align=center|0:17
|Austin, Texas, United States
|
|- 
|Win
|align=center|16–8–1
|Jared Lopez
|TKO (knees and punches) 
|Bellator 19
|
|align=center|3
|align=center|2:16
|Grand Prairie, Texas, United States
|
|- 
|Win
|align=center|15–8–1
|Ryan Webb
|Submission (kimura) 
|Supreme Warrior 10
|
|align=center|3
|align=center|2:14
|Frisco, Texas, United States
|
|- 
|Win
|align=center|14–8–1
|Danny Tims
|Decision (unanimous)   
|C3 Fights 19
|
|align=center|3
|align=center|3:00
|Newkirk, Oklahoma, United States
|
|- 
|Win
|align=center|13–8–1
|Tim Snyder
|Submission (rear-naked choke)  
|Supreme Warrior 9
|
|align=center|1
|align=center|0:55
|Frisco, Texas, United States
|
|- 
|Win
|align=center|12–8–1
|Humberto DeLeon
|Decision (unanimous) 
|Cage Kings 6
|
|align=center|3
|align=center|3:00
|Bossier City, Louisiana, United States
|
|- 
|Loss
|align=center|11–8–1
|Mike Baskis
|Submission (guillotine choke)
|Supreme Warrior 8
|
|align=center|3
|align=center|2:22
|Frisco, Texas, United States
|
|- 
|Win
|align=center|11–7–1
|Daniel Pineda
|Submission (triangle choke)
|Supreme Warrior 7
|
|align=center|2
|align=center|2:58
|Frisco, Texas, United States
|
|- 
|Win
|align=center|10–7–1
|Francisco Barragan
|Submission (D'Arce choke)
|Urban Rumble 4
|
|align=center|1
|align=center|0:53
|Pasadena, California, United States
|
|- 
|Win
|align=center|9–7–1
|Jeremy Dodd
|TKO (punches)
|Supreme Warrior 5
|
|align=center|1
|align=center|2:11
|Frisco, Texas, United States
|
|- 
|Loss
|align=center|8–7–1
|Daniel Pineda
|Submission (kneebar)
|Supreme Warrior 3
|
|align=center|1
|align=center|2:00
|Frisco, Texas, United States
|
|- 
|Loss
|align=center|8–6–1
|Dustin Neace
|Submission (kneebar)
|King of Kombat 5
|
|align=center|1
|align=center|1:38
|Austin, Texas, United States
|
|- 
|Win
|align=center|8–5–1
|Shane Waits
|Submission (armbar)   
|Elite Combat League 1
|
|align=center|2
|align=center|2:12
|Bixby, Oklahoma, United States
|
|- 
|Win
|align=center|7–5–1
|Joshua Lee
|Submission (rear-naked choke)  
|Supreme Warrior 1
|
|align=center|1
|align=center|1:38
|Frisco, Texas, United States
|
|- 
|Win
|align=center|6–5–1
|Rocky Long
|Decision (unanimous)  
|King of Kombat 4
|
|align=center|3
|align=center|5:00
|Austin, Texas, United States
|
|- 
|Loss
|align=center|5–5–1
|Stephen Ledbetter
|Submission (triangle choke)
|Revolution Fight League 3
|
|align=center|1
|align=center|N/A
|Macon, Georgia, United States
|
|- 
|Win
|align=center|5–4–1
|Damon Chamberlin
|TKO (punches)
|Toledo Fight Challenge 
|
|align=center|1
|align=center|0:24
|Toledo, Ohio, United States
|
|- 
|Win
|align=center|4–4–1
|Justin Moore
|TKO (punches)
|Knockout Promotions
|
|align=center|2
|align=center|3:22
|Louisville, Kentucky, United States
|
|- 
|Win
|align=center|3–4–1
|Rocky Long
|Decision (unanimous)
|Adrenaline Fight Sports 1
|
|align=center|3
|align=center|5:00
|Lufkin, Texas, United States
|
|- 
|Loss
|align=center|2–4–1
|Billy Vaughan
|Submission (heel hook)
|Explosion CFC 2
|
|align=center|1
|align=center|1:31
|Tinley Park, Illinois, United States
|
|- 
|Loss
|align=center|2–3–1
|Arman Loktev
|Submission (armbar)
|Fightfest 11
|
|align=center|1
|align=center|0:28
|Canton, Ohio, United States
|
|- 
|Win
|align=center|2–2–1
|Dan Caesar
|Submission (guillotine choke)
|Explosion CFC 1
|
|align=center|1
|align=center|0:20
|Tinley Park, Illinois, United States
|
|- 
|Loss
|align=center|1–2–1
|Dustin Neace
|Submission (armbar)
|Genesis 5
|
|align=center|2
|align=center|0:56
|Findlay, Ohio, United States
|
|- 
|Draw
|align=center|1–1–1
|Kris Kanaley
|Draw
|Ironheart Crown 11
|
|align=center|2
|align=center|5:00
|Hammond, Indiana, United States
|
|- 
|Win
|align=center|1–1
|Roc Castricone
|TKO (punches)
|Fightfest 8
|
|align=center|1
|align=center|2:43
|Cleveland, Ohio, United States
|
|- 
|Loss
|align=center|0–1
|Chino Duran
|Submission (choke)
|Xtreme Gladiators 3
|
|align=center|1
|align=center|N/A
|Richmond, Virginia, United States
|

Mixed martial arts exhibition record

|-
| Loss
| align=center| 2–1
| John Dodson
| KO (punches)
| The Ultimate Fighter: Team Bisping vs. Team Miller
|  (airdate)
| align=center| 2
| align=center| 1:00
| Las Vegas, Nevada, United States
| 
|-
| Win
| align=center| 2–0
| Josh Ferguson
| Decision (unanimous)
| The Ultimate Fighter: Team Bisping vs. Team Miller
|  (airdate)
| align=center| 2
| align=center| 5:00
| Las Vegas, Nevada, United States
| 
|-
| Win
| align=center| 1–0
| Carson Beebe
| Submission (neck crank)
| The Ultimate Fighter: Team Bisping vs. Team Miller
|  (airdate)
| align=center| 1
| align=center| 4:19
| Las Vegas, Nevada, United States
|

Bare knuckle record

|-
|Win
|align=center|6-1
|Reggie Barnett, Jr.
|Decision (unanimous)
|BKFC 20
|
|align=center|5
|align=center|2:00
|Biloxi, Mississippi, United States
|
|-
|Loss
|align=center|5–1
|Dat Nguyen	
|Decision (unanimous)
|BKFC KnuckleMania
|
|align=center|5
|align=center|2:00
|Miami, Florida, United States
|
|-
|Win
|align=center|5–0
|Charles Bennett
|TKO (hand injury)
|BKFC 9 
|
|align=center|2
|align=center|2:00
|Biloxi, Mississippi, United States
|
|-
|Win
|align=center|4–0
|Reggie Barnett, Jr.
|Decision (unanimous)
|BKFC 6 
|
|align=center|5
|align=center|2:00
|Tampa, Florida, United States 
|
|-
|Win
|align=center|3–0
|Abdiel Velazquez
|TKO (punches)
|BKFC 5
|
|align=center|4
|align=center|0:58
|Biloxi, Mississippi, United States
|
|-
|Win
|align=center|2–0
|Matt Murphy
|Decision (unanimous)
|BKFC 3: The Takeover
|
|align=center|5
|align=center|2:00
|Biloxi, Mississippi, USA
|
|- 
|Win
|align=center|1–0
|Nick Mamalis
|TKO (punches)
|BKFC 1: The Beginning
|
|align=center|2
|align=center|1:41
|Cheyenne, Wyoming, USA
|

References

External links
 
 
 Johnny Bedford - UFC Fans

1983 births
Living people
American male mixed martial artists
Mixed martial artists from Ohio
Bantamweight mixed martial artists
Mixed martial artists utilizing collegiate wrestling
Mixed martial artists utilizing Brazilian jiu-jitsu
American practitioners of Brazilian jiu-jitsu
People awarded a black belt in Brazilian jiu-jitsu
American male sport wrestlers
People from Woodville, Ohio
Bare-knuckle boxers
Ultimate Fighting Championship male fighters